The 1976 Dallas Cowboys season was their 17th in the league. The team improved on their previous output of 10–4, winning eleven games. They qualified for the playoffs, but were stunned by the Los Angeles Rams in the Divisional round.

NFL Draft

Schedule

Division opponents are in bold text

Playoffs

Standings

Roster

Season recap
The Cowboys entered the year with high expectations, dominating the regular season by finishing with an 11-3 record, while capturing the NFC East title. But they came up short in the first round of the divisional playoffs, after being heavily favored at home against the Los Angeles Rams, but still losing 14-12.

Publications
The Football Encyclopedia 
Total Football 
Cowboys Have Always Been My Heroes

References

Dallas Cowboys seasons
NFC East championship seasons
Dallas Cowboys
Dallas Cowboys